Neacomys paracou, also known as the Paracou neacomys or Paracou bristly mouse, is a rodent species from South America in the genus Neacomys. It is found in northern Brazil, French Guiana, Guyana, Suriname and southeastern Venezuela.

References

Duff, A. and Lawson, A. 2004.  Mammals of the World: A checklist. New Haven: A & C Black. .

Neacomys
Mammals described in 2001